Joseph "Uncle Joe" Vlasits (1921 – 23 April 1985) was a Hungarian football player and manager who coached the Australian national side from 1967 to 1969.

Early life and playing career

Vlasits was born in 1921 in Budapest, Hungary. He played for Budapest First Division club Nemzeti  but his career was cut short by injury and he moved to Australia in the late 1940s.

Managerial career

In Australia, Vlasits moved into management, and coached New South Wales Division One side Canterbury-Marrickville from 1958 to 1960, winning titles in 1958 and 1960 and winning the Ampol Cup in '58. He then coached Sydney Prague and Budapest in 1961 and '62 respectively, winning the Division One title with both clubs. He then took over at fellow Division One side Pan-Hellenic for 1963 and '64, but could only manage fourth- and sixth-place finishes. He then dropped down a league to Division Two side Bankstown, which placed sixth in his only year of management, 1965. He returned to Division One in 1966 with strugglers SSC Yugal, which came third-last that season. A two-year stint at Melita Eagles-Newtown saw the club finish third-last in both the 1967 and '68 Division One seasons. He coached the Australian national side from 1967 to '69, and coached the team to victory in the 1967 Quoc Khanh Cup, winning all five matches they played. It was Australia's first international footballing honour. He coached Australia for a total of 23 games — 13 wins, seven draws, and three losses. He returned to Pan-Hellenic for the 1972 season, and the team came seventh in Division One. He then managed Northern Districts to the Division Three title in 1974.

Death

Vlasits died at the age of 64 on 23 April 1985.

Honours

As a manager

Canterbury-Marrickville

New South Wales Division One: 1958, 1960
Ampol Cup: 1958

Sydney Prague

New South Wales Division One: 1961

Budapest

New South Wales Division One: 1962

Australia

Quoc Khanh Cup: 1967

Northern Districts

New South Wales Division Three: 1974

Managerial statistics

References

External links
Joe Vlasits' profile on ozfootball.net

Australia national soccer team managers
1921 births
1985 deaths
Hungarian expatriate football managers
Hungarian footballers
Footballers from Budapest
Association footballers not categorized by position